National Institute of Design may refer to:

National Institute of Design, Ahmedabad, with main campus in Ahmedabad, Gujarat, India
National Institute of Design, Bengaluru, an R&D campus in Bangalore, Karnataka
National Institute of Design, Bhopal, a campus in Bhopal, Madhya Pradesh
National Institute of Design, Gandhinagar, a post-graduate campus in Gandhinagar, Gujarat
National Institute of Design, Jorhat, a campus in Jorhat, Assam
National Institute of Design, Kurukshetra, a campus in Kurukshetra, Haryana
National Institute of Design, Vijayawada, a campus in Vijayawada, Andhra Pradesh